Tungussko-Chunsky district was a former district (raion) of the former Evenk Autonomous Okrug which was merged into Krasnoyarsk Krai on 1 January 2007.

Location 

Tungussko-Chunsky district was located in the south-east of the Evenk Autonomous Okrug. The total area of the district was 111,600km2 - the district's length from west to east at the widest point was 340 kilometres, and from north to south was 540 kilometres.

When the district was created, the administrative centre was the village of Strelka-Chunya. However, in 1935, the administrative centre was changed to the village of Vanavara. The reason for the change was the distance of Strelka-Chunya from the district's main waterway, Podkammenoy Tunguski, which caused difficulties in communication with other settlements in the district.

The district contained 5 settlements (postal codes in brackets):

 The village of Vanavara (648490) - population 2,943
 The village of Mutoray (648483) - population 90
 The village of Oskoba (648484) - population 13
 The village of Strelka-Chunya (648482) - population 184
 The village of Chemdalsk (648481) - population 51

The distances of the other settlements from Vanavara vary between 160 kilometres and 200 kilometres.

History 

In 1908, before the creation of the district, the area which it later controlled was the epicentre of the Tunguska event.

Population 

The population of the town and 9 settlements of the former district (since 1939) were:

 1939: 1,869
 1959: 2,229
 1970: 2,037
 1979: 2,547
 1989: 6,346
 2002: 3,709
 2010: 3,479

References 

Krasnoyarsk Krai
Evenk Autonomous Okrug